Noroliveroline is an anticholinergic alkaloid.

References

Anticholinergic alkaloids
Heterocyclic compounds with 5 rings
Aporphine alkaloids
Benzodioxoles
Oxygen heterocycles